Dabin Lee, who goes by the mononymous stage name Dabin, is a Canadian musician, DJ, and record producer. He has released three albums, the first of which was nominated for the Juno Award for Electronic Album of the Year in 2018.  He has collaborated with major EDM artists including Illenium,  Said the Sky, Seven Lions and Slander.

Biography
Dabin is originally from Toronto, Canada.

His album Two Hearts was nominated for the Juno Award for Electronic Album of the Year in 2018.

Dabin collaborated with Slander and Seven Lions on the single "First Time", released on October 13, 2018.

He collaborated with Said the Sky on several songs including "Superstar" (feat. Linn) (2018) and "Hero" (feat. Olivver The Kid) (2019). The two performed together as Dab the Sky at the Digital Mirage Online Music Festival in 2020.

He was a guitarist and supporting member on Illenium's Awake (2017), Awake 2.0 (2018), and Ascend (2019) concert tours, On Christmas Day 2020, Dabin, Illenium, and Lights released the song "Hearts On Fire", which reached number 11 on the Billboard Dance/Electronic Songs chart and number 16 on the New Zealand Hot Singles (RMNZ) chart. He also participated in Illenium's Trilogy concert at Allegiant Stadium in Las Vegas on July 3, 2021. This was the stadium's first-ever music concert event since its opening.

His Into the Wild tour, which supported his second album Wild Youth, was postponed in 2020 (with some venues cancelled) because of the COVID-19 pandemic.  In October 2021, he released his third studio album Between Broken and resumed his Into the Wild tour. He held a US tour to support his third album for the first half of 2022. His album single "Holding On" was featured on iHeartRadio and became the No. 1 added song of the week in mid-February 2022 after he won the iHeartRadio Future Star 

Dabin announced the Sanctuary Tour for the spring 2023 with support artists Ray Volpe, Jvna, Grabbitz, and Myrne. This includes a stop at the Red Rocks Amphitheatre, where he is reported to be the first Korean electronic music artist to headline that venue, the Shrine in Los Angeles, and the Brooklyn Mirage / Avant Gardner.

Personal life 
Dabin lives in Denver, Colorado.

Discography

Albums / EPs 
 Two Hearts (Kannibalen, 2017)
 Wild Youth (Seeking Blue, 2019)
 Wild Youth (acoustic EP, Seeking Blue, 2020)
 Between Broken (Seeking Blue, 2021)

References

External links 
 

Living people
Canadian DJs
Canadian electronic musicians
Dubstep musicians
Musicians from Toronto
Future bass musicians
Electronic dance music DJs
Musicians from Denver
Year of birth missing (living people)
Canadian musicians of Korean descent